Rezső Somlai-Stolzparth (1911 – 1983) was a Hungarian footballer, who was in Hungary squad at the 1934 FIFA World Cup.

He played for Ferencvárosi TC, OGC Nice, Kispesti FC, Olympique Alès, Red Star and Ujvideki AC.

He managed Bulgaria and Levski Sofia. As coach of Levski, he won a Double by winning the Bulgarian championship in 1949 and the Bulgarian Cup in the same 1949 year, finished the 1948–49 season unbeaten in both competitions as well.

References

Sources

1911 births
1983 deaths
Year of death missing
Association football midfielders
Hungarian footballers
Hungarian expatriate footballers
Expatriate footballers in France
Ferencvárosi TC footballers
OGC Nice players
Budapest Honvéd FC players
Olympique Alès players
Red Star F.C. players
Ligue 1 players
NAK Novi Sad players
1934 FIFA World Cup players
Hungarian football managers
Bulgaria national football team managers
PFC Levski Sofia managers
Expatriate football managers in Bulgaria
FK Daugava Rīga managers
Expatriate football managers in the Soviet Union